Dawn Breakers International Film Festival (DBIFF) was an international travelling film festival held in various cities throughout the world from 2007-2015. The festival debuted in Phoenix, Arizona and was later held in San Diego, Houston and Zurich. DBIFF was recognized as an important festival and nominated at the 2014 annual list of MovieMaker's "Top 25 Film Festivals of the World" in the Social Cause category. Selected films from this festival has received theatrical distribution, television broadcast and four Academy Award nominations.

Background
The Festival is a non-profit organization focused on showcasing films and filmmakers who produce positive films. It has shown both independent and commercial films in the past few years. The filmmakers submit from around the world and there are no restrictions on what is accepted as long as it meets the theme of the festival. DBIFF is one of the few festivals in the world that also accepts Television, Music Videos and Websidoes in their selection. Several publications have covered the festival and the films including the Indian Express, the BNS, and the Samoan news.

Since it is a traveling festival and may take place more than once within a year, it is also named by "Takes" alongside the year.

2007 / Take 1
The festival took place in San Diego with a circle of invited guests and audiences only. A number of films were screened through the two-day festival, however no public announcement of the official selections were made as there were no selection process that year and all films were invites only.

2008 / Take 2
In 2008, it attracted some 500 attendees each day and a total of 1000 for both days from around the world. Films shown in the festival were selected from around the globe, some countries included India, Australia, United States, Spain, United Kingdom, Cambodia, France, Malaysia, Hungary, Pakistan, Canada and Ethiopia.

Films
Armed - Music video, Justin Baldoni's directorial debut
A Boy from Jenjarom - Short documentary
Ardia - Short film
Corde - Short documentary
Choke - Short film
Donkey In Lahore - Full-length documentary, Tribeca winner
Justice - Short film
Little Mosque on the Prairie - Television show
Son Maloso - Music Video
The Gallery - Short film
The Prayer - Short film
The Wayfarer - Full-length documentary
Tsehai Loves Learning - Animated television show (Ethiopia)
Uncle Hathi - Animated television show (India)

2009 / Take 3
The 2009, also known as Take 3 Dawn Breakers International Film Festival took place in Zurich from December 26, 2009 to December 31, 2009. This year's line-up included twice as many films as last year and took place over five days.

Films
18:44, Short film, New Zealand, World Premier
Afghan, Short film
Amor in Motion, Short film, World Premier
Antes Que O Mundo Acabe (Before the World Ends), Feature film, World Premier
Arising to Serve, Full-length doc, World Premier
Baber Makes An Entrance – Little Mosque on the Prairie, TV, World Premier
Chase, Short film, World Premier
IL Diavlo (The Devil), Short film
El Espiritu de mi Mama, Feature film (Mexico), World Premier
Essences & Particularities, Experimental, World Premier
Fast Slow Dissolving Tablets, Short film, World Premier
Fragile, Short film
The Fashioner, Documentary, World Premier
From Reservation to Revelation, Documentary, World Premier
Got You, Music video, World Premier
Hossein Amanat - Baha'i Architect, Documentary, World Premier
The Voyages of Jenny Alexandria, Animation
Lie Zi  (Master Lie), Animation, World Premier
Light Upon Light, Short film, World Premier
The Lost City, Short film
Method Acting, Short film
Murder With Impunity, Webcast, World Premier
My New Home, Short film
The Power of Forgiveness, Documentary, World Premier
The Promise of World Peace, Documentary, World Premier
The Providence Effect, Documentary International Premier
Red Fish, Short film
Social Studies, Short film, World Premier
Speak and Lie, Animation, World Premier
School, Short film, World Premier
The Study Circle, Webcast, World Premier
Tanha-e (Solitude), Animation
Tokaheya Inajin - The First to Arise, Documentary, World Premier
Two Men, Two Cows, Two Guns, Short film
United for Baha'i Human Rights, Webcast, World Premier
What Goes Around Comes Around, Music Video,

2010 / Take 4
The 2010 film festival took place in the United States in the city of San Diego. It was scheduled for November 26 through 27 at the Sheraton Hotel across San Diego International Airport. On November 13, 2010 a press release announced the festival's official selection which included 44 films in all categories.

William Sears (Baháʼí) a popular TV host from the 1950s was honored during the festival. Two of this year's selection are shortlisted for the 83rd Academy Awards. and one was nominated. Most of this year's selection were either world or international premiers.

Films
Below is a particle list of the selected films with notes about each film.

A Cut Above
Adam – The Man
All Birds Whistle
Aqueous Duende - experimental film
Annie, Forget Your Gun
Y aquellas (And These)
Bobo & Kipi - TV show from Congo
Das Verlorene Paradies (Paradise Lost)
Dr. Elham Show Websisodes from South Africa
Enoch Olinga
Feeling from Afghanistan
Faith in Common starting Anthony Azizi Music by KC Porter
Escuchar (Listen) - Spain
The Butterfly Circus funded by Doorstep
Hemels Bewegen (The Conquest of High Passes)
Plastic & Glass - French experimental
Out of Sight
No Longer There - Music video of Carl Young by Jack Lenz
Nebeneinander (Side By Side)
Madregot (Stairs)
Madagascar, carnet de voyage, nominated for the Oscars
Linger - Singapore's new wave
Letters to Ourselves
Jewel in the Lotus - about the House of Worship in India
Glenn, The Flying Robot feature film from Ireland
The Secret Friend
The Road Home Student Oscar winner
The Last Conversation - about the Persecution of Baháʼís
The Invigilator
Hands of the Cause - four volume film about the Hands of the Cause
Straight Ahead
Shoghi Effendi (documentary) about Shoghi Effendi
Roca Bon - exploring the art of Mark Tobey
River to Reef - environmental film
Kol Shtut (Any Little Thing)
Laredo, Texas
To Comfort You
Where There is Love - video of Elika Mahony
Vostok Station
Us (film)
Urs (film)
Zero on the Oscar shortlist

2011 / Take 5
A two-day festival was held in Houston. This festival marked DBIFF's premier in the south and the first major event to be held in the Houston Community Center.

A Media Boot Camp in association with the BMS was held during the ABS conference in San Francisco in August 2011.

2012 / Take 6
Take 6 / 2012 festival takes place in Switzerland.

Take 6 Films
20zwoelf (20zwoelf) / Christian Stahl / Animation / Germany / Switzerland Premiere
Amen! / Moritz Mayerhofer / Animation / Germany / Switzerland Premiere
Andersartig (Different) / Dennis Stein-Schomburg / Animation / Germany / Switzerland Premiere
Baed Az Class (After The Class) / Fereshteh Parnian / Short Narrative / Iran / World Premiere
Batang Aquarium (Aquarium Kids) / Eleazar L. Del Rosario / Documentary / Philippines / International Premiere
Bestiaire / Denis Côté / Documentary / Canada / France / Switzerland Premiere
Booze Culture / Graeme Noble / Short Narrative / United Kingdom / World Premiere
Chant Supplications Together: Tap Into the Power of Devotional Singing / Nancy A. Watters / Documentary /  Canada / World Premiere
D'Symmetrie vum Päiperlek (The Symmetry of the Butterfly) / Paul Scheuer and Maisy Hausemer / Feature Narrative / Luxembourg / International Premiere
Don't Hug Me I'm Scared / Joseph Pelling, Becky Sloan / Short Narrative / UK / Switzerland Premiere
Ei voor later / Marieke Schellart / Documentary / Netherlands / Switzerland Premiere
Faced out / Omar Nayef / Documentary / Egypt / World Premiere
Fast in a Day / Afshin Rohani, Sahba Saberian, Victoria Eyton / Documentary / UK / World Premiere
Father's Chair (A Cadeira Do Pai) / Luciano Moura / Feature Narrative / Brazil / Switzerland Premiere
Felix (Felix) / Anselm Belser / Short Narrative / Germany / Switzerland Premiere
Finding Ambrosia / Colin Scully / Short Narrative / United States / World Premiere
Fishing Without Nets / Cutter Hodierne  / Short Narrative / Kenya / Switzerland Premiere
Freedom / Khaled Hafi / Short Narrative / Algeria, France, Tunisia / International Premiere
Geschwister (Siblings) / Joya Thome / Short Narrative / Germany / Switzerland Premiere
Good Error / Mo'men Abd Elsalam / Animation / Egypt / World Premiere
Guilford Street (Οδός Γκύλφορδ) / Christos Ouzounis / Short Narrative / Greece / World Premiere
Haraka (Motion) / Sarah Rozik / Documentary / Egypt / World Premiere
Here in the Last Moment / Nicola Trombley / Experimental / USA / World Premiere
Home / Yann Arthus-Bertrand / Documentary / France / World Premiere
Iranian Taboo / Reza Allamehzadeh / Documentary / Netherlands, U.S.A. / Switzerland Premiere
Jesus and Buddha: Practicing Across Traditions / John Ankele, Anne Macksoud / Documentary / United States / World Premiere
l'île (the island) / Pauline Delwaulle / Documentary / France / International Premiere
Landscape of the Elderly / Rami el Harayri & Maarten Stoltz / Short Narrative / Netherlands / Switzerland Premiere
Logging Sports / Andreas Attai / Documentary / USA / World Premiere
Lotus Sutra / Deepak Verma, Neha Chopra / Documentary / India / World Premiere
Luminous Journey: Abdu'l-Baha in America, 1912 / Tim Perry / Documentary / United States / World Premiere
May 1926 / Tasnim Mustafa / Short Narrative / Egypt / World Premiere
Memoria / Yihwen Chen / Short Narrative / Malaysia / European Premiere
Memories / Ferhat Alpözen / Short Narrative / Turkey / World Premiere
Morning Prayer / Nabil Moghaddam / Music Video / Canada / World Premiere
My Last Days / Justin Baldoni / Documentary / USA / World Premiere
Neue Nähe / Sonja Vukovic, Christian Stahl / Short Narrative / Germany / Switzerland Premiere
New Light / Sahba Sanai / Short Narrative / Australia / World Premiere
Old Angel (老天使) / Yen-Ting Chiang / Animation / Taiwan (ROC) / World Premiere
Otis Under Sky / Anlo Sepulveda / Feature Narrative / USA / International Premiere
Occupy Skepticism / Juan Sebastian Barreneche / Documentary / United States / World Premiere
Peter Bossman dobrodošel (Welcome Peter Bossman) / Simon Intihar / Documentary / Slovenia / Switzerland Premiere
Raising the Titanic / Alex Mitchell / Documentary / United States / World Premiere
Reiko's Hina Dolls / Komaki Matsui / Short Narrative / Canada, USA / World Premiere
Sailor / Brittany Gustafson / Short Narrative / United States of America / World Premiere
Silence and Desire (Sessizlik ve Özlem) / Imren Tuzun / Short Narrative / Turkey / European Premiere
Scorpions (Skorpionit) / Simo Hakalisto / Documentary / Finland / World Premiere
Sol de Verano  (Summer's sun) / David Dely / Music Video / Hungary, Colombia / World Premiere
Super Soul Sunday / Devon Gundry / Television / USA / International Premiere
Rustman (Zhangis katsi) / Giorgi Tavartkiladze / Short Narrative /  Georgia / World Premiere
The Dance / Pardis Parker / Short Narrative / Canada / Switzerland Premiere
The Gospel of Us / Dave McKean / Feature Narrative / United Kingdom / World Premiere
The Most Beautiful Flower Blooms in Winter / Vic Barnes / Short Narrative / United States / World Premiere
The Photograph / Sonbol Taefi, Sohail Sabetian / Music Video / New Zealand, Ireland, China / World Premiere
The Settler / Maram Ashour / Short Narrative / United Arab Emirates / International Premiere
The Sweatshop / Chin Tangsakulsathaporn / Short Narrative / United States / European Premiere
Thomas Hempel / Regieassistent (Thomas Hempel - First Assistant Director) / Short Narrative / Germany / World Premiere
Thunder May Have Ruined The Moment / Pete Monro / Experimental / USA / World Premiere
Transit in a green landscape / Sonja van Kerkhoff, Sen McGlinn / Music Video / New Zealand / Switzerland Premiere
Truks / Joao Inacio / Documentary / Brazil / International Premiere
Txiki / Sergio San Martin / Documentary / Spain / Switzerland Premiere
Uncle Hathi and His Friends - The pink Rabbit / Hamed Mohajer / Animation / India / World Premiere
Under the Staircase / Kimia Ferdowsi Kline / Documentary / United States / International Premier
West Gilgo Mural Project / John Bragino / Documentary / United States / International Premiere

Hueman Photography Contest
The festival announced a photography contest that would showcase the works of its finalists during the film festival.

2013 / Take 7
The festival was held in Scottsdale, Arizona over two days and was the first time to be coordinated locally. It was the second time DBIFF proceeds went to charity, the first being Houston.

2014 / Take 8
Submission period for the 2014 film festival took place over three months and ended in December 2013.

2015 / Take 9
The 2015 festival was held online with content being broadcast from New York. The festival moved submission system to FilmFreeway.

References

External links
 Official website
 DBIFF 2010
 DBIFF 2009
 IMDB listing
 BritFilms listing

Film festivals held in multiple countries
Bahá'í Faith
Short film festivals in the United States
Animation film festivals in the United States
Documentary film festivals in the United States
Documentary film festivals in Switzerland
Experimental film festivals